The Ward's Crossing Bridge is a historic bridge in rural eastern Yell County, Arkansas. The bridge carries County Road 8 across the Fourche La Fave River, south of Plainview. The bridge is mounted on concrete piers, and has a wooden deck carrying a single lane of traffic. The bridge was built in 1905 by the Converse Bridge Company. It is the only camelback truss bridge in the county, and one of only three known in the state.

The bridge was listed on the National Register of Historic Places in 2008.

See also
Fourche LaFave River Bridge: a historic bridge over the Fourche La Fave River
Wallace Bridge: a historic bridge over the Fourche La Fave River
List of bridges documented by the Historic American Engineering Record in Arkansas
List of bridges on the National Register of Historic Places in Arkansas
National Register of Historic Places listings in Yell County, Arkansas

References

External links

Road bridges on the National Register of Historic Places in Arkansas
Historic American Engineering Record in Arkansas
National Register of Historic Places in Yell County, Arkansas
Bridges completed in 1905
Parker truss bridges in the United States
1905 establishments in Arkansas
Transportation in Yell County, Arkansas
Fourche La Fave River